Ángel Miguel Merino Torres (born 2 October 1966) is a Spanish retired football central midfielder and manager.

He amassed La Liga totals of 293 games and 26 goals over nine seasons, with Osasuna and Celta. He added 158 matches and 16 goals in the Segunda División, in representation of three clubs.

Merino started working as a manager in 2004, spending several years at Osasuna in various capacities.

Playing career
Born in Madrid, Merino started playing football with local club CD Leganés, with whom he appeared in two Segunda División B seasons. In 1988, he moved straight into La Liga after signing with CA Osasuna, making his debut in the competition on 4 September in an away match against Real Madrid and scoring the last goal in a 2–2 draw.

In 1992–93, Merino scored a career-best six goals (in 35 matches), helping the Navarrese to finish in tenth position. After the team's relegation the following campaign, he joined RC Celta de Vigo also in the top flight, being first choice during his three-year tenure.

From 1997 to 2002, Merino competed in the Segunda División, netting a total of 16 goals for UD Las Palmas, Leganés and Burgos CF and suffering administrative relegation with the latter team. He retired at the age of 36, after one season in the third tier with AD Ceuta.

Coaching career
One year after retiring, Merino returned to Osasuna and started working with its youth sides. In March 2008 he was appointed at the reserves who competed in division three, his first game in charge being a 1–0 away win over CF Palencia late into the month.

After being relegated from the third tier in 2013, Merino cut ties with the club and joined neighbouring Peña Sport FC in the same capacity. After meeting the same fate, he was relieved of his duties.

Personal life
Merino's son, Mikel, is also a footballer and a midfielder. He too played for Osasuna.

References

External links

Celta de Vigo biography 

1966 births
Living people
Spanish footballers
Footballers from Madrid
Association football midfielders
La Liga players
Segunda División players
Segunda División B players
CD Leganés players
CA Osasuna players
RC Celta de Vigo players
UD Las Palmas players
Burgos CF footballers
AD Ceuta footballers
Spanish football managers
Segunda División B managers